Petro Yakovych Sarafyniuk (born September 28, 1966) is a former long-distance runner from Ukraine, who won the Eindhoven Marathon on October 8, 1995, clocking 2:16:40. He represented his native country at the 1996 Summer Olympics in Atlanta, Georgia, where he finished in 43rd place in the marathon with a total time of 2:20:37.

Achievements
All results regarding marathon, unless stated otherwise

References
sports-reference
 Petro Sarafyniuk at National Olympic Committee in Vinnytsia Oblast. ukr.

1966 births
Living people
Ukrainian male long-distance runners
Olympic athletes of Ukraine
Athletes (track and field) at the 1996 Summer Olympics
Ukrainian male marathon runners